WinCo Foods, Inc. (a portmanteau of The Winning Company) is a privately held, majority employee-owned American supermarket chain based in Boise, Idaho, with retail stores in Arizona, California, Idaho, Montana, Nevada, Oklahoma, Oregon, Texas, Utah, and Washington. It was founded in 1967 as a no-frills warehouse-style store with low prices. The stores feature extensive bulk food sections.

Until 1998, it operated as Waremart and Cub Foods, the latter under a franchise agreement. However, WinCo began re-establishing Waremart Foods in 2017. , WinCo has 138 retail stores and six distribution centers, with over 20,000 employees. As of May 2022, WinCo Foods was No. 46 in Forbes.com's list of the largest privately owned companies in the United States.

Overview
WinCo Foods is based in Boise, Idaho. It was founded in 1967, and the company is mostly owned by current and former employees through an employee stock ownership plan. WinCo operates distribution centers in:
 Woodburn, Oregon 
 Myrtle Creek, Oregon 
 Boise, Idaho 
 Phoenix, Arizona 
 Denton, Texas 
 Modesto, California

The company reduces operating expenses by purchasing directly from manufacturers and farmers; operating basic, no-frills stores; bagging service is not provided. In addition the company does not accept credit cards for payment (debit and WIC/EBT cards are accepted).

History

The company, originally called "Waremart", was founded in Boise, Idaho, in 1967 by Ralph Ward and Bud Williams as a no-frills, warehouse-style grocery store focusing on low prices. In 1985, Waremart employees established an employee stock ownership plan and purchased a majority stake of Waremart from the Ward family, making the company employee-owned.

In January 1991, Waremart opened an  store in Boise to replace the two older Boise stores. At the time, Waremart was operating 16 stores in the Northwest and had reported annual sales of more than $300 million.

WinCo Foods 

In October 1998, Waremart changed its name to WinCo Foods, citing confusion with retailers Kmart and Walmart as reason for the new name. The name is a portmanteau of "winning company". Nonetheless, Oregon stores — those in Independence, Keizer, and Ontario — are branded as "Waremart by WinCo".

In 2007, WinCo Foods accused a competing chain, Save Mart, of directing a lawsuit filed by a neighborhood group Tracy First of Tracy, California, to oppose city approval of a WinCo store. That same year, WinCo Foods opened in Pittsburg, California.

In early 2009, WinCo opened its first two stores in the Spokane, Washington, area. In October, 2009, WinCo expanded to Utah, adding two stores in West Valley City and Midvale. An additional Utah store opened in Roy on June 28, 2010. bringing the total number of stores expanded to Utah to five. WinCo previously operated stores in Utah under the Waremart banner prior to the company's name change.

In January 2011, WinCo began signing leases for an expansion to Southern Nevada and Arizona. The chain opened stores in Las Vegas and Henderson, Nevada on March 4, 2012. The company's first two stores in Arizona opened on April 1, 2012 in the Phoenix area. The company has opened multiple locations in Texas, including the Dallas–Fort Worth area.

WinCo was named as the sponsor for the WinCo Foods Portland Open in June, 2013.

In late 2014, WinCo announced that it would enter the Oklahoma City metro market, starting with stores in Moore and Midwest City, with plans to open two other locations in the metro.

See also

 Cub Foods
 List of companies based in Idaho
 List of supermarket chains in the United States
 Food cooperative

References

External links

 WinCo Foods official website

1967 establishments in Idaho
Companies based in Boise, Idaho
Employee-owned companies of the United States
Privately held companies based in Idaho
Retail companies established in 1967
Discount stores of the United States
Supermarkets of the United States
Superstores in the United States